Dilpreet Dhillon, is an Indian singer and actor associated with the Punjabi music and Punjabi film industry. He started his career as a singer, and later debuted as an actor with the Once Upon A Time In Amritsar.

Early life
Dhillon was born on 24 August 1991 in Fatehgarh Sahib, Punjab. His real name was Amarinder Singh, although he changed his name to Dilpreet Dhillon after becoming a singer. He did his schooling from Sant Ishar Singh Ji Memorial Public School, Ludhiana. He then moved to New Zealand to complete his higher education.

Career
Dhillon started his singing career in 2014 with the song Gunday No 1. After the success of the song Gunday No 1, Dilpreet Dhillon released his next song, 32 Bore, which was quite popular.

Discography

Studio albums

Singles discography

Filmography

==References==

21st-century Indian male singers
21st-century Indian singers
1991 births
Living people